Marcel Kajzer (born 16 April 1990) is a Polish  motorcycle speedway rider who was a member of the Poland U-19 national team.

In 2009 season he will ride for Start Gniezno (Poland), Fjelsted (Denmark) and Mseno (Czech Republic).

Career details

World Championships 
 Individual U-21 World Championship
 2009 – Lost in Domestic Qualifications

European Championships 

 Individual U-19 European Championship
 2007 – Lost in Domestic Qualifications
 2008 –  Stralsund – 13th place (4 points)
 2009 – 10th place in Semi-Final 3
 Team U-19 European Championship
 2008 –  Rawicz – 4th place (2 points)

Domestic competitions 

 Individual Polish Championship
 2008 – 16th place in Quarter-Final 4
 Individual U-21 Polish Championship
 2008 – 14th place in Semi-Final 2
 2009 – 10th place in Qualifying Round 3
 Silver Helmet (U-21)
 2008 – 15th place in Semi-Final 1
 Bronze Helmet (U-19)
 2008 – 13th place in Semi-Final 1

See also 
 Poland national speedway team
 Speedway in Poland

References 

1990 births
Living people
Polish speedway riders
Place of birth missing (living people)